Teletoon, a portmanteau of "television" and "cartoon", is used for the names of several television channels: 

 Teletoon Canada, wholly owned by Corus Entertainment, owns the following television animation channels, both in Canada:
 Teletoon, an English-language channel that will be replaced by Cartoon Network on March 27, 2023
 Télétoon, a French-language channel
 Teletoon+, a brand name for television channels targeting children owned by Canal+ Group, not associated with the Canadian channels:
 Télétoon+, formerly Télétoon; a French television channel previously under the Télévision Par Satellite group
 Teletoon+, formerly Minimax Poland and ZigZap; a Polish television channel currently owned by ITI Neovision, a Canal+ Group company